Spilarctia casigneta is a moth in the family Erebidae. It was described by Walter Rothschild in 1910. It is found in northern Pakistan, the Himalayas, Nepal and Bhutan.

References

Moths described in 1910
casigneta